Cosmin Augustin Tilincă (born 1 August 1979) is a Romanian footballer currently under contract with Sănătatea Cluj. He began football at his hometown club Arieşul Turda. During the summer of 2002 he moved to CFR Cluj, where he played until 2007. During this period he was the team's goal getter and was given the nickname Tili-goal.

In 2005, he was called up by coach Victor Pițurcă at Romania's national team, but he never played due to an injury. Additionally, he played in the 2005 Intertoto Cup, where he was the competition's top goalscorer with 9 goals scored in 10 matches.

Honours
CFR Cluj
Divizia B: 2003–04
UEFA Intertoto Cup runner-up: 2005

References

External links

Cosmin Tilincă at Fupa

1980 births
Living people
Romanian footballers
Association football forwards
Liga I players
Liga II players
ACS Sticla Arieșul Turda players
CFR Cluj players
FCV Farul Constanța players
ACF Gloria Bistrița players
CS Pandurii Târgu Jiu players
Romanian expatriate footballers
Romanian expatriate sportspeople in Germany
Expatriate footballers in Germany
People from Turda